Trinophylum is a genus of longhorn beetles in the tribe Callidiopini, erected by Bates in 1878.

The type species Trinophylum cribratum, sometimes called the "Deodar Longicorn Bast-eater" feeds on Deodar trees Cedrus deodara.  It has been recorded from India and Pakistan but has also been accidentally introduced into southern England.

Species
BioLib lists:
 Trinophylum cribratum Bates, 1878 - type species
 Trinophylum descarpentriesi Gressitt & Rondon, 1970 - Laos

References

External links
 
 

Callidiopini
Beetles described in 1878
Cerambycidae genera
Beetles of Asia